Torah Academy of Bergen County (commonly referred to as TABC) is a four-year yeshiva high school located in Teaneck, in Bergen County, New Jersey, United States. The school utilizes a split-schedule day offering both Jewish studies and college preparatory secular courses. The school has been accredited by the Middle States Association of Colleges and Schools Commission on Elementary and Secondary Schools since 2005.

TABC is run by Rabbi Shlomo Stochel, Head of School; the Rosh HaYeshiva, Rabbi Yosef Adler; Rabbi Steven Finklestein, Associate Principal; and Rabbi Dr. Michael Atlas, Assistant Principal. Rabbi Michael Hoenig is the Mashgiach Ruchani (religious life guidance counselor).

As of the 2019–20 school year, the school had an enrollment of 327 students and 47.5 classroom teachers (on an FTE basis), for a student–teacher ratio of 6.9:1. The school's student body was 100% White.

Academic programs
Various Advanced Placement (AP) courses are offered primarily to juniors and seniors, such as AP Biology, AP Calculus, AP English Language and Composition, AP English Literature and Composition, AP Physics, AP Psychology, AP Statistics, and AP United States History.

The building hosts a second school called the SINAI Special Needs Institute. The program serves children of below to above average intelligence with different degrees of learning disability and a wide variety of behavioral characteristics, whose needs could not be addressed by traditional Jewish day school programs and curricula. The students have separate administrators and teachers from TABC, though they share some classrooms.

Extracurricular activities
TABC has a number of extracurricular activities, some that do well even on the international level. The school's Mock trial team was the 2005 New Jersey State Champions and received press coverage both in the Tri-State Region as well as overseas for its efforts to gain accommodations to participate in the National High School Mock Trial Championship in Charlotte, North Carolina without being required to compete during the Jewish Sabbath.

The school has an International Bible Contest (Chidon HaTanach) team which is coached by Rabbi Neil Winkler.  In 2017, junior Shlomi Helfgot placed 4th in the world in the international competition which takes place in Jerusalem on Yom HaAtzma'ut.

The school also has a notable Science Olympiad Team, having won the Yeshiva League for the past 6 years, as well as College Bowl, with Junior Varsity having been undefeated since 2014.

Athletics
TABC has various sports teams, including baseball, softball, basketball, hockey and wrestling and others.

In an effort to build inter-community relationships in Teaneck, former Torah Academy athletic director Bobby Kaplan and then assistant principal Rabbi Tzvi Grumet, arranged for the TABC Storm to play a pair of exhibition basketball games in 2000 against the Knights of the Al-Ghazaly High School, a Muslim high school in the township.

The varsity hockey team has won the MYHSAL championship five times (1997–1998, 2006–2007, 2007–2008, 2012-2013 and 2015–2016). The JV team has won the MYHSAL championship a record eight times (1997–1998, 2002–2003, 2008–2009, 2009–2010, 2010–2011, 2011–2012, 2012–2013, 2013–2014, and 2017–2018). TABC is known as a hockey powerhouse and both teams have made the championship consistently.

TABC's wrestling team had placed 3rd in the Wittenberg Championships from 2007 to 2010. In 2009, TABC had six finalists and two champions. In 2010, TABC had three champions - Navid Ahdoot (112 lbs), Evan Friedlander (171 lbs) and Dovid Greenfield (285 lbs) - as well as several second and third place wrestlers. In 2011 TABC placed second overall with three first-place winners including Shimmy Auman, Evan Friedlander, Dovid Greenfield. In 2013, TABC won Wittenberg with three champions, and eleven total placers. TABC wrestlers Efraim Ellman, Dovid Greenfield, Navid Ahdoot, Ramin Ahdoot and Lior Shachar have been inducted into the Wittenberg Hall of Fame. TABC Wrestling has also continued to place well at Wittenberg even fielding smaller teams. They have wrestled at the Brick Memorial Tournament, The Randolph Wrestling Tournament, The North Bergen Wrestling Tournament, and more. 2016-2017 saw another individual first-place finish from Ben Antosofsky 19' (126 lbs), as well as more high placements. In 2017-2018 Dovid Meiseles took home 1st, with a myriad of 2nd - 5th-place finishes backing him up.

The TABC track team was undefeated in 2014–2015, 2015-2016, and 2016–2017. The team is coached by alumnus Shmuel Knoller ('13). Notably, Zachary Greenberg came in 3rd place in his age group in the Jerusalem Marathon in 2016.

The school also has both a varsity and junior varsity basketball team coached by former St. John's assistant Coach Oswald Cross.

The Yeshiva University Red Sarachek basketball tournament plays some of its games in the TABC gym, for which they received an award in 2004. TABC also participated in Sarachek in 2012, entering the tournament as the 13th seed and finishing ranked #12 overall. In 2016, TABC again participated in the tournament, entering as the #9 seed. In the first round, TABC defeated the Rabbi Alexander S. Gross Hebrew Academy Warriors on a last second shot, but were defeated in the second round by eventual-champion DRS Wildcats 34–31.

Controversies

Homophobia
In 2015, TABC student Akiva Hirsch wrote an article in Eye of The Storm speaking out against the "overbearing homophobia in this school." TABC did not issue a response to this article. Hirsch later left the school.

References

External links
Torah Academy of Bergen County
Kol Torah
Israel Report

1982 establishments in New Jersey
Boys' schools in New Jersey
Educational institutions established in 1982
Jewish day schools in New Jersey
Middle States Commission on Secondary Schools
Modern Orthodox Jewish day schools in the United States
Modern Orthodox Judaism in New Jersey
Private high schools in Bergen County, New Jersey
Teaneck, New Jersey
Orthodox yeshivas in New Jersey